Block Peak is a peak,  high, standing  northwest of Mauger Nunatak in the Grosvenor Mountains. It was discovered by Rear Admiral Byrd on the Byrd Antarctic Expedition flight to the South Pole in November 1929, and named by him for William Block, son of Paul Block who was a patron of the expedition.

References 

Mountains of the Ross Dependency
Dufek Coast